Kruithof is a surname. Notable people with the surname include:

Arie Andries Kruithof, Dutch physicist, professor of applied physics at Eindhoven University of Technology
Jaap Kruithof (1929–2009), Belgian philosopher and writer

See also
Kruithof curve, relating the illuminance and colour temperature of light sources